People's Park may refer to:

Brazil
People's Park (São Paulo)
People's Park (Campina Grande), in Campina Grande
People's Park (Presidente Prudente), in Presidente Prudente

China
People's Park (transcribed as Rénmín Gōngyuán) is a common name for urban parks in Chinese cities.
 People's Park (Chengdu)
 People's Park (Guangzhou)
 People's Park (Haikou)
 People's Park (Kashgar)
 People's Park (Nanchang)
 People's Park (Nanning)
 People's Park (Shanghai)
 People's Park (Shenzhen)
 People's Park (Tianjin)
 People's Park (Ürümqi)
 People's Park (Xining)
 People's Park (Zhengzhou)
 People's Park (Zibo)
 Hua Luogeng Park, Jintan, formerly People's Park
 Norbulingka, Lhasa, also known as People's Park
 Qingcheng Park, Hohhot, formerly People's Park

Denmark
 Folkets Park, Copenhagen, People's Park, Copenhagen
 Folkeparken, Roskilde, People's Park, Roskilde

Ireland
 People's Park, Dún Laoghaire, near Dublin
 People's Park, Limerick
 The People's Park, Waterford

Philippines
 People's Park (Davao City)
 Valenzuela People's Park
 People's Park in the Sky, Tagaytay

United Kingdom
 Albert Park, Middlesbrough, England
 Mowbray Park, Sunderland, Tyne and Wear, England
 People's Park, Banbury, Oxfordshire, England
 People's Park, Halifax, West Yorkshire, England
 The People's Park, Ballymena, Northern Ireland
 Saltwell Park, Gateshead, England
 Victoria Park, London, known colloquially as the People's Park

United States
 People's Park (Berkeley), California
 People's Park, Paterson, a section of Paterson, New Jersey

Other countries
 People's Park (Budapest), Hungary
 People's Park, Chennai, India
 People's Park (Folkets park), Sweden
 People's Square and Park, Yangon, Myanmar

See also
 People's Park Complex, a commercial and residential building in Singapore
 People's Park Centre, a shopping centre in Singapore
 Volksgarten (disambiguation)
 People's Square (disambiguation)